Anas Doukkali is a professor and a Moroccan politician. He served as the Minister of Health from 2018 to 2019

Political career 

Anas Doukkali was the former Minister of Health in Morocco. He was a former politician for the Party of Progress and Socialism.

References 

Living people
Moroccan politicians
1973 births
Health ministers of Morocco